Wang Yanxin (born November 1963) is a Chinese scientist and the current president of China University of Geosciences (Wuhan).

Education
Wang was born in Yuanping, Shanxi in November 1963. He secondary studied at Xiaochang No. 1 High School. After the resumption of college entrance examination, he entered Nanjing University, where he graduated in 1984. He received his master of engineering degree in hydrogeology and doctor of engineering degree in hydrogeology from China University of Geosciences (Wuhan) in 1987 and 1990, respectively.

Career
After graduation, he taught there. He was promoted to associate professor in 1992 and to full professor in 1994. From 1998 to 1999 he was a senior visiting scholar at the University of Waterloo. He served as vice-president of China University of Geosciences (Wuhan) in January 2000, and ten years later promoted to the President position.

Honours and awards
 2004 National Science Fund for Distinguished Young Scholars
 September 24, 2019 Applied Hydrogeology Award
 November 22, 2019 Member of the Chinese Academy of Sciences (CAS)
 December 2019 John Hem Award for Excellence in Science and Engineering

References

External links
Wang Yanxin on China University of Geosciences (Wuhan) 

1963 births
Living people
People from Yuanping
Scientists from Shanxi
Nanjing University alumni
China University of Geosciences alumni
Academic staff of China University of Geosciences
Members of the Chinese Academy of Sciences